Rhoose Point is a headland and a settlement near the village of Rhoose in the Vale of Glamorgan, Wales. Rhoose Point is the most southerly settlement of Wales. It may also be the southernmost point of mainland Wales, although this has also been claimed for nearby Breaksea Point. The Vale of Glamorgan Council had installed a permanent notice marking Rhoose Point as the most southerly part of Wales's mainland and there is a small stone circle marking the point.

Rhoose cement works, an asbestos factory and a quarry used to be located to the north or Rhoose Point. This land has been reclaimed and is the site of the Rhoose Point Housing scheme, where over 1,000 houses have greatly extended the village of Rhoose.

To the east, the island of Flat Holm in the Bristol Channel, currently under the administration of Cardiff, lies almost on the same latitude as Rhoose and Breaksea Points.

Notes

References

External links 

Headlands of the Vale of Glamorgan
Rhoose